Athol is a historic home located at Henderson, Caroline County, Maryland.  It is a -story single-pile brick dwelling built around 1825 by William Jones. It has several characteristics common to the few remaining early-19th-century brick three-bay-wide houses of modest size on the Eastern Shore of Maryland: Flemish bond facade, common bond on the sides and rear, chimneys at each end of a gable roof, and Federal stylistic influence.

It was listed on the National Register of Historic Places in 1989.

References

External links

, including photo from 1977, at Maryland Historical Trust

Houses in Caroline County, Maryland
Houses on the National Register of Historic Places in Maryland
Houses completed in 1825
Federal architecture in Maryland
National Register of Historic Places in Caroline County, Maryland